Patrick J. Hanratty was an American computer scientist and businessperson, known as the "Father of CAD/CAM"—computer-aided design and computer-aided manufacturing. Up to 2013, he was president and CEO of Manufacturing and Consulting Services (MCS) of Scottsdale, Arizona, a company he founded. According to the University of California in 2012, industry analysts think that "70 percent of all 3-D mechanical CAD/CAM systems available today trace their roots back to Hanratty’s original code".

Early career

Hanratty earned a PhD from the University of California, Irvine. He worked for General Electric, where in 1957 he wrote Pronto, an early commercial numerical control programming language. Then he moved in 1961 to General Motors Research Laboratories where he helped to develop DAC, (Design Automated by Computer).

Banking standard
Around the mid-1950s Hanratty and a team from the Stanford Research Institute using equipment built by the General Electric Computer Laboratory developed standardized machine-readable characters for use on bank checks. Adopted by the American Bankers Association in 1958, their characters are still in use and magnetic ink character recognition (MICR) and the E-13B font became standard in the industry.

Business
In 1970 he founded his own company, where he learned valuable lessons. Hanratty later said, "Never generate anything closely coupled to a specific architecture. And make sure you keep things open to communicate with other systems, even your competitors." The business, called ICS, failed because its product, a CAD/CAM drafting system, was tied to a computer that very few people had available, and because its product was written in TPL, an unfamiliar language for most people.

In 1971 Hanratty founded Manufacturing and Consulting Services (MCS), applying what he had learned at ICS. All the software was written in Fortran and it ran on almost any computer. His product was named Automated Drafting and Machining (ADAM), later AD-2000, and still later Anvil-4000. This package was very successful.

Among well-known customers of MCS were Computervision who licensed Adam for CADDS, Gerber Scientific for IDS 3, and McDonnell Douglas who licensed it for Unigraphics. Several well-known CAD/CAM packages were developed from MCS products. Among them were Auto-Grapl, Autosnap 3D, Anvil-5000, and Intelligent Modeler.

Auto-Grapl in particular demonstrates what Hanratty had learned: "the computer writes the program for you".

Personal life
Hanratty was married to Sandra and they had 3 children and 13 grandchildren. He died July 28, 2019.

Notes

References

External links
 MCS ReAnsys

1931 births
2019 deaths
American computer programmers
American technology company founders
University of California, Irvine alumni
People from Scottsdale, Arizona